Gerhard Trampusch (born 11 August 1978) is an Austrian former racing cyclist. He competed in the men's individual road race at the 2004 Summer Olympics.

Major results

1999
 4th Overall Tour de l'Avenir
1st  Points classification
 4th Overall Tour of Austria
2000
 4th Grand Prix du Midi Libre
 7th Overall Tour of Austria
2003
 2nd Uniqa Classic
2005
 2nd Road race, National Road Championships
 3rd Overall Tour of Austria
1st Stage 4
2006
 1st Stage 2 Bayern-Rundfahrt
 7th Overall Tour of Austria

Grand Tour general classification results timeline

References

External links

1978 births
Living people
People from Hall in Tirol
Austrian male cyclists
Olympic cyclists of Austria
Cyclists at the 2004 Summer Olympics
Sportspeople from Tyrol (state)